Hisato (written: , , , ,  or ) is a masculine Japanese given name. Notable people with the name include:

, Japanese music critic
, Japanese businessman and banker
, Japanese gymnast
, Japanese swimmer
, Japanese politician
, Japanese composer
, Japanese footballer
, Japanese musician known professionally as Char
, Japanese swimmer

Japanese masculine given names